In 1993, Hollywood Records released The Party's Over...Thanks for Coming with little advance notice.  This farewell album consisted of some outtakes from the Free recording sessions and previously recorded songs before the group disbanded.

Track listing
Movin' On (Michael Vizcarra, Chasen Hampton, Andre Williams, Keith Williams) - 4:06 - Chase
Sorry (Tiffini Hale, Desmond Hillard, Romany Malco, Sarah Jo Martin) - 3:44 - Tiffini
Yellow Butterfly (Deedee Magno, Jay Colin, Willie McNeil) - 4:06 - Deedee
Goin' Down (Albert Fields, Michael Vizcarra) - 4:54 - Albert
I Only Want You (Tiffini Hale, Deedee Magno, Sarah Jo Martin, Howie Tee) - 3:47 - Deedee & Tiffini
Let's Hold on to What We Got feat. Remedy (Michael Price, Richard Scher) - 4:05 - Deedee
Hot Fun in the Summertime (Sylvester Stewart) - 4:12 - Group
Forgive Me, Girl (Albert Fields, Andre Williams, Keith Williams) - 4:30 - Albert
You Dropped a Bomb on Me (Charlie Wilson, Lonnie Simmons, Rudy Taylor) - 4:09 - Damon, Albert & Chase
Sad Memory (Richie Furay) 3:44 - Chase
I Wish You Peace (MC Gizmo, DJ Dino) - 5:17 - Deedee

1993 albums
Hollywood Records albums
The Party (band) albums